Satnarayan Maharaj , also known as Sat Maharaj, (April 17, 1931 – November 16, 2019) was a Trinidadian and Tobagonian Hindu religious leader, educationalist, and civil rights activist in Trinidad and Tobago. He was the Secretary-General of the Sanatan Dharma Maha Sabha, a major Hindu organisation in Trinidad and Tobago and the wider Caribbean.

The Sanatan Dharma Maha Sabha operates 150 mandirs and over 50 schools in Trinidad and Tobago. It was formed in 1952 when Bhadase Sagan Maraj, the father-in-law of Satnarayan Maharaj, engineered the merger of the Satanan Dharma Association and the Sanatan Dharma Board of Control. An affiliated group, the Pundits' Parishad, has 200 affiliated pundits. The organisation's headquarters are located in St. Augustine.

Under the Secretary General Satnarayan Maharaj, the Maha Sabha has modernised all 42 schools and built 5 secondary schools as well as 12 early childhood educational centres. Maharaj has also revived the observance of Phagwah and was instrumental in the creation of the Indian Arrival Day holiday and annual celebrations. The Maha Sabha also introduced a Children's Cultural Festival - Baal Vikaas Vihar.

References

Sat Maharaj: Hindu Civil Rights Leader of Trinidad & Tobago 

1931 births
2019 deaths
Trinidad and Tobago religious leaders
20th-century Hindu religious leaders
Trinidad and Tobago people of Indian descent
Maharaj, Satyanarayan
Democratic Labour Party (Trinidad and Tobago) politicians
Deaths from cerebrovascular disease